USS Hunt may refer to:

She served in the United States Coast Guard from 1930 to 1934. She was recommissioned in 1940, transferred to the Royal Navy as HMS Broadway, served in World War II and scrapped in 1945

United States Navy ship names